Bagisara laverna is a species of moth in the family Noctuidae (the owlet moths).

The MONA or Hodges number for Bagisara laverna is 9175.2.

References

Further reading

 
 
 

Bagisarinae
Articles created by Qbugbot
Moths described in 1889